1353 Maartje, provisional designation , is an Eoan asteroid from the outer regions of the asteroid belt, approximately 37 kilometers in diameter. It was discovered on 13 February 1935, by Dutch astronomer Hendrik van Gent at the Union Observatory in Johannesburg, South Africa. The asteroid was named after Maartje Mekking, daughter of a staff member at the Dutch Leiden Observatory.

Orbit and classification 

Maartje is a member the Eos family, the largest asteroid family in the outer main belt consisting of nearly 10,000 known members. It orbits the Sun at a distance of 2.7–3.3 AU once every 5 years and 3 months (1,907 days; semi-major axis of 3.01 AU). Its orbit has an eccentricity of 0.10 and an inclination of 9° with respect to the ecliptic.

Naming 

This minor planet was named after Maartje (Nin) Maria Lindenburg Mekking (1924–2007), daughter of B. G. Mekking (1903–1971), an orbit computer at the Leiden Observatory. The official naming citation was mentioned in The Names of the Minor Planets by Paul Herget in 1955.

Physical characteristics 

Maartje has been characterized as an L- and S-type asteroid by PanSTARRS photometric survey, while the overall spectral type of the Eos family is that of a K-type.

Rotation period and poles 

Several rotational lightcurve of Maartje have been obtained from photometric observations since 2005. Lightcurve analysis gave a consolidated, slightly longer-than average, and well-defined rotation period of 22.930 hours with a brightness amplitude between 0.25 and 0.46 magnitude. The asteroid's lightcurve has also been modeled and gave two concurring periods of 22.9924 and 22.9926 hours. Modeling in 2018 determined two spin axis of (285.0°, 73.0°) and (119.0°, 41.0°) in ecliptic coordinates (λ, β).

Diameter and albedo 

According to the surveys carried out by the Infrared Astronomical Satellite IRAS, the Japanese Akari satellite and the NEOWISE mission of NASA's Wide-field Infrared Survey Explorer, Maartje measures between 33.75 and 42.175 kilometers in diameter and its surface has an albedo between 0.0687 and 0.136.

The Collaborative Asteroid Lightcurve Link derives an albedo of 0.1660 and a diameter of 34.16 kilometers based on an absolute magnitude of 9.9.

Notes

References

External links 
 (1353) Maartje, 3D Asteroid Catalogue
 1353 Maartje Orbit Sketch – Minor Planet Center
 Asteroid Lightcurve Database (LCDB), query form (info )
 Dictionary of Minor Planet Names, Google books
 Asteroids and comets rotation curves, CdR – Observatoire de Genève, Raoul Behrend
 Discovery Circumstances: Numbered Minor Planets (1)-(5000) – Minor Planet Center
 
 

001353
Discoveries by Hendrik van Gent
Named minor planets
19350213